Feelings may refer to:
 Feelings, the plural of feeling
 Emotion

Books
 Feelings (Hyde book), a 1975 collection of writings by Evan X Hyde
 Feelings (Aliki book), a 1984 book by Aliki Brandenberg

Films
 Feelings (1968 film), Soviet film
 Feelings (1974 film), British film directed by Gerry O'Hara
 Feelings (2003 film), French film

Music

Albums
 Feelings, Paul Anka album, 1975
 Feelings (Johnny Mathis album), 1975
 Feelings (Milt Jackson album), 1976
 Feelings (Ferrante & Teicher album), 1977
 Feelings (David Byrne album), 1997
 Feelings (The Grass Roots album), 1968

Songs
 "Feelings" (Hayley Kiyoko song), 2017
 "Feelings" (Lauv song), 2019
 "Feelings" (Maroon 5 song), 2015
 "Feelings" (Morris Albert song), 1975
 "Feelings" (The Grass Roots song), 1968
 "Feelings" (Zonke song), 2012

See also
 Feeling (disambiguation)
 Feelin's (disambiguation)
 "Feelins'", a 1975 song by Conway Twitty and Loretta Lynn
 "Feelin'", a 1991 song by the La's
The Feeling, a British band
The Feelings, an album by Obliterate
 Mixed feelings, ambivalence